Follo Håndballklubb (Follo HK Damer) is the women's handball team based in Ski, Follo. The team plays in REMA 1000-ligaen, the top division in the country, since its promotion in 2021.

Team

Current squad
Squad for the 2021–22 season

Goalkeepers
 1  Hilde Søyseth
 12  Mille Fuglei
 55  June Cecilie Krogh
Wingers
RW
 14  Mari Nilsen Solberg
 31  Juni Høgden Mæle
 44  Victoria Neverdal
LW 
 20  Andrea Landås Gabrielsen
 35  Frida Svae Eggum
 74  Sofie Vik
Line players
 6  Ida Ringlund Hansen
 23  Maria Keiserås Haugen
 28  Aleksandra Mandic

Back players
 4  Lea Tidemann Stenvik
 5  Ingeborg Brøste Fossnes
 7  Mirela Gjikokaj
 8  Katarina Karlsen Ugland
 11  Martine Kårigstad Andersen
 15  Tilde Alræk
 18  Silje Alvestad
 22  Maren Sofie Tefrum
 33  Malin Berg Osnes
 43  Eline Gerø

2022–2023 Transfers

Joining
  Andrea Landås Gabrielsen (LW) (from  Storhamar HE) with immediate effect

Leaving
  Mina Hesselberg (LW) (to  Vipers Kristiansand) with immediate effect
  Martine Kårigstad Andersen (LB) (to  Vipers Kristiansand)

Technical staff
 Head coach: Bendik Berg
 Assistant coach: Adrian Ark Saastad
 Assistant coach: Ingvill Helland Anderson

Notable former club players
  Tina Magnus
  Catharina Fiskerstrand Broch
  Tiril Spæren
  Mie Rakstad
  Mia Kristin Syverud 
  Kristiane Knutsen
  Sara Møller
  Mina Hesselberg

References

Norwegian handball clubs
Handball clubs established in 2007
2007 establishments in Norway
Ski, Norway